Ras Abu 'Ammar was a Palestinian Arab village in the Jerusalem Subdistrict.   It was depopulated during the 1948 Arab-Israeli War on October 21, 1948, by the Har'el Brigade of Operation ha-Har. It was located 14 km west of Jerusalem, surrounded on three sides by the Wadi al-Sarar.

History
The nearby Kh. Kafr Sum have remains from  the Crusader era, including a court-yard building and rock-cut cisterns. A tower to the south east was later turned into Maqam ash-sheikh Musafar. Victor Guérin noted that:  "There are a lot of rickety houses, which are built of small, almost unhewn stones, near one waly, which stands in the shade of a mulberry tree of several hundreds years old. Not far from it there is a semicircle swimming pool, built in a crude way". And further: "A large structure, partly built of ancient stones with typical projection, served as a mosque, as we can tell from the presence of the mihrab in it. It is very likely that the structure had stood before the  Muslims settled here, and they just adopted it for their cult". 

The SWP described it as "a small stone village on a hill; to the east in a small valley is a good spring, with a rock-cut tomb beside it."

Ottoman era
In 1838, both et-Ras and Kefr Sur were noted as villages in the el-Arkub district, southwest of Jerusalem.

In 1863 Victor Guérin was pointed out on a mountain the small village of Ras Abu 'Ammar, which high position had given its name.

An Ottoman village list from around 1870 showed that Ras Abu Ammar had 6 (?) houses and a population of 92, though the population count only included men.   

In 1883, the PEF's Survey of Western Palestine (SWP)  described Ras (Abu 'Ammar) as "a large stone village on a spur, with a fine spring in the valley to the north-west. The hill has only a little scrub on it, but the valley, which is open and rather flat, has olives in it."

In 1896 the population of Ras Abu 'Ammar was estimated to be about 279 persons.

British Mandate era

In the 1922 census of Palestine conducted by the British Mandate authorities, Ras Abu Ammar had a population 339, all Muslims,  increasing in the 1931 census when it was counted with Aqqur and Ein Hubin, to 488, in 106 houses.

In the 1945 statistics, the village, with a population of 620 Muslims, had 8,342 dunams of land according to an official land and population survey. Of the land, 925 dunams were plantations and irrigable land 2,791  were for cereals, while 40 dunams were built-up (urban) land.

1948 and aftermath
On 4 August, 1948, two weeks into the Second truce of the  1948 Arab–Israeli War, Grand Mufti of Jerusalem and Palestinian nationalist Amin al Husseini noted that ‘for two weeks now . . . the Jews have continued with their attacks on the Arab villages and outposts in all areas. Stormy battles are continuing in the villages of Sataf, Deiraban, Beit Jimal, Ras Abu ‘Amr, ‘Aqqur, and ‘Artuf . . .’

The village was depopulated on October 21, 1948. The area was later incorporated into the State of Israel and the village of Tzur Hadassah was established on Ras Abu 'Ammar land in 1960.

In 1992 the village site was described: "The stone rubble of the village houses is strewn across the site. Wild vegetation grows among the debris, in addition to almond, olive, and carob trees. Cactuses grow on the southeastern and southwestern sides of the site; a two-room stone building that used to be the schoolhouse still stands to the southeast."

References

Bibliography

 
  
 
 
 
 
 (p. 153: nearby Kafr Sum)
 
 
  
 
 (p.  195)

External links
Welcome To Ras Abu 'Ammar, palestineremembered.com
Ras Abu 'Ammar,  Zochrot
Survey of Western Palestine, Map 17:    IAA, Wikimedia commons
Mosque in Khirbet Kafr Sum
Ras Abu 'Ammar, from the Khalil Sakakini Cultural Center
Ras Abu 'Ammar Palestine Family

Arab villages depopulated during the 1948 Arab–Israeli War
District of Jerusalem